Casper Kaarsbo Winther (born 11 February 2003) is a Danish professional footballer who plays as a midfielder for Danish Superliga club Lyngby.

Club career
He made his Danish Superliga debut for Lyngby on 1 March 2021 in a game against SønderjyskE. He suffered relegation to the Danish 1st Division with the club on 9 May 2021 after a loss to last placed AC Horsens.

References

External links
 

2003 births
Living people
Danish men's footballers
Denmark youth international footballers
Association football midfielders
Lyngby Boldklub players
Danish Superliga players
Danish 1st Division players